The Simple English Bible (1978, 1980) was an attempt to present the Bible in easy to understand, modern English. It was translated by International Bible Translators and the Bible Translation Committee included F. Wilbur Gingrich, Jack P. Lewis, Hugo McCord, Clyde M. Woods, S. T. Kang, Gary T. Burke, and Milo Hadwin. The chairman was Stanley L. Morris, who served as an editor in the Translation Department of the American Bible Society from 1968 to 1972 under Eugene A. Nida.

The version is based on a limited 3000 word vocabulary and everyday sentence structure.

The Simple English Bible is also marketed as the Plain English Bible, the International English Bible, and the God Chasers Extreme New Testament.

References

Bible translations into English
1978 non-fiction books
1978 in Christianity
Controlled English